Derrimut (also spelt Derremart or Terrimoot) ( – 20 April 1864), was a headman or arweet of the Boonwurrung (Bunurong) people from the Melbourne area of Australia.

Derrimut was born around 1810, before European settlement of the colony of Victoria. 

In October 1835 he informed the early European settlers  of an impending attack by "up-country tribes". The colonists armed themselves, and the attack was averted. Benbow from the Bunurong and Billibellary, from the Wurundjeri, also acted to protect the colonists in what is perceived as part of their duty of hospitality.

He fought in the late 1850s and early 1860s to protect Boonwurrung rights to live on their land at Mordialloc Reserve. When the reserve was closed in July 1863, his people were forced to unite with the remnants of Woiwurrung and other Victorian Aboriginal communities to settle Coranderrk Mission station, near Healesville.

Derrimut became very disillusioned and died at the Melbourne Benevolent Asylum at the age of about 54 years on 20 April 1864. 
In his honour, over his body, interred in the Melbourne General Cemetery according to European rather than Aboriginal rites, a tombstone was erected. The text of his tombstone reads: 

"This stone was erected by a few colonists
To commemorate the noble act of the native Chief Derrimut who by timely information given October 1835 to the first colonists
Messrs Fawkner, Lancey, Evans, Henry Batman and their  saved them from massacre, planned by some of the up-country tribes of Aborigines.
Derrimut closed his mortal career in the Benevolent Asylum, 
May 28th 1864 ; aged about 54 Years"

The Melbourne suburb of Derrimut is named after him.

References

Further reading
 Lack, John. 1991, 'Traditional Koori Society/The Destruction of Koori Society' in A History of Footscray, Hargreen Publishing Company, North Melbourne, Victoria
 Presland, Gary. 1994, The Land of the Kulin: Discovering the lost landscape and the first people of Port Phillip, McPhee Gribble, Penguin Books, Australia.
 Presland, Gary. 1997, The First Residents of Melbourne's Western Region, Revised Edition, Harriland Press, Forest Hill, Victoria.
 Priestley, Susan. 1988, Clans of the Kulin in Altona A Long View, Hargreen Publishing Company, North Melbourne, Victoria.
 Walsh, Larry. 1996, STILL HERE: A brief history of Aborigines in Melbourne's western region up to the present day, Melbourne's Living Museum of the

1810s births
1864 deaths
Indigenous Australian people
Year of birth missing
People associated with massacres of Indigenous Australians
Burials at Melbourne General Cemetery